Dustan Kyle Mohr (born June 19, 1976) is an American former Major League Baseball outfielder who played for several teams between 2001 and 2007.

Amateur career
A native of Hattiesburg, Mississippi, Mohr attended Oak Grove High School and the University of Alabama. In 1996, he played collegiate summer baseball with the Wareham Gatemen of the Cape Cod Baseball League. Mohr was selected by the Cleveland Indians in the ninth round of the 1997 MLB Draft.

Professional career
After spending three seasons in the Indians' minor league system, Mohr was released and signed with the Minnesota Twins as a free agent in 2000. Starting midway through the  season, the Twins used a platoon of Mohr and Bobby Kielty in right field, causing fans to dub the duo "Dusty Kielmohr". This platoon persisted on and off for two years.

After four seasons in the Twins organization, Mohr was traded to the San Francisco Giants before the  season. Mohr struggled during the first few months before catching fire in early June. His aggressive defense and clutch hitting made him a favorite among Giants fans.

The Giants closed in on the division leading Los Angeles Dodgers in the last month of the season. In the second to last series of the season, against the San Diego Padres, Mohr was injured as he tracked down a foul ball in right field. He tripped over the bullpen mound as the ball tailed towards the stands. He held on to the ball, and the Padres scored the game's winning run. He did not play during the season's final series against the Dodgers.

As a member of the Boston Red Sox, Dustan Mohr filled in occasionally in outfield, either replacing Trot Nixon or Coco Crisp. While Crisp was out, Mohr had a spot on the major league roster, but he struggled with the big league club hitting: .175 with 2 home runs and 3 RBI. His stint with the Red Sox was short as Mohr was demoted to the Pawtucket Red Sox where he continued to struggle at the plate. He finished the  season as a member of the Detroit Tigers playing for their Triple-A affiliate, the Toledo Mud Hens.

In , Mohr signed a minor league contract with the Tampa Bay Devil Rays, and was called up on June 23, but was released a month later .

Mohr signed with the Wichita Wingnuts of the American Association for the  season., but signed with the Colorado Rockies on May 27, 2008. On June 23, the Rockies released Mohr. In January , he re-signed with the Wingnuts.

He played with the Long Island Ducks of the Atlantic League in 2010.

Personal life
He is married to the former Denise Johnson.

References

External links

1976 births
Living people
Alabama Crimson Tide baseball players
Major League Baseball outfielders
Minnesota Twins players
San Francisco Giants players
Colorado Rockies players
Boston Red Sox players
Tampa Bay Devil Rays players
Baseball players from Mississippi
Sportspeople from Hattiesburg, Mississippi
Kinston Indians players
Akron Aeros players
Colorado Springs Sky Sox players
Pawtucket Red Sox players
Toledo Mud Hens players
Durham Bulls players
Long Island Ducks players
Wichita Wingnuts players
Wareham Gatemen players